The Bosnia and Herzegovina Billie Jean King Cup team represents Bosnia and Herzegovina in Billie Jean King Cup tennis competition and are governed by the Tennis Association of Bosnia and Herzegovina.  They currently compete in the Europe/Africa Zone of Group I.

History
Bosnia and Herzegovina competed in its first Billie Jean King Cup in 1997.  Their best result was reaching Group I in 2002.  Prior to 1992, Bosnian players represented Yugoslavia.

Current team (2017)
Dea Herdželaš
Jelena Simić
Anita Husarić
Nefisa Berberović

Results and schedule

1997–1999

2000–2009

2010-

See also
Billie Jean King Cup
Bosnia and Herzegovina Davis Cup team

External links

Billie Jean King Cup teams
Billie Jean King Cup
Billie Jean King Cup